The 2005 Peru Census was a detailed enumeration of the Peruvian population. It was conducted by the Instituto Nacional de Estadística e Informática from July 18 through August 20, 2005. Its full name in Spanish is X Censo de Población y V de Vivienda ("Tenth Population and Fifth Household Census"). The previous census performed in Peru was the 1993 Census. The following census was the 2007 Census.

The results of the census were released to the public on November 30, 2005 after all the census materials from the country's 25 regions were transported to Arequipa and processed at the INEI information processing center in that city.

Results
The total population of Peru is 26,152,265 inhabitants. The following table shows a breakdown of the total population per region and the Lima Province.

See also
 Peru Census

References
 INEI: Perú tiene 26 millones 152 mil 265 habitantes

Censuses in Peru
Demographics of Peru
2005 in Peru
Peru